Kuyucak can refer to:

 Kuyucak
 Kuyucak, Acıpayam
 Kuyucak, Burhaniye
 Kuyucak, Dodurga
 Kuyucak, Mecitözü